Henri Colans (born 5 July 1915, date of death unknown) was a Belgian weightlifter. He competed at the 1948 Summer Olympics and the 1952 Summer Olympics.

References

External links
 

1915 births
Year of death missing
Belgian male weightlifters
Olympic weightlifters of Belgium
Weightlifters at the 1948 Summer Olympics
Weightlifters at the 1952 Summer Olympics
Sportspeople from Brussels
20th-century Belgian people